Bradina planalis is a moth in the family Crambidae. It was described by Charles Swinhoe in 1894. It is found in the Indian state of Meghalaya. The type locality was Cherrapunji.

References

Moths described in 1894
Bradina